Bonne of Luxemburg or Jutta of Luxemburg (20 May 131511 September 1349), was born Jutta (Judith), the second daughter of King John of Bohemia, and his first wife, Elisabeth of Bohemia. She was the first wife of King John II of France; however, as she died a year prior to his accession, she was never a French queen.  Jutta was referred to in French historiography as Bonne de Luxembourg, since she was a member of the House of Luxembourg. Among her children were Charles V of France, Philip II, Duke of Burgundy, and Joan, Queen of Navarre.

Biography
In June or July 1315, Jutta was betrothed to the future King Casimir the Great of Poland, son of Władysław Łokietek., but he married Aldona of Lithuania in 1325 instead.

In 1326, Jutta was next betrothed to Henry of Bar. This arrangement was broken, however, and she stayed at the abbey of Saint-Esprit until her marriage to John, Duke of Normandy and future King John II of France.

Jutta was married to John, Duke of Normandy, on 28 July 1332 at the Collegiate Church of Notre-Dame, Melun. She was 17 years old, and the future king was 13. Her name Jutta (or Guta), translatable into English as Good (in the feminine case), was changed by the time of her marriage to Bonne (French) or Bona (Latin). Upon marriage, Bonne was the wife of the heir to the French throne, becoming Duchess of Normandy and Countess of Anjou and Maine. The wedding was celebrated in the presence of six thousand guests. The festivities were prolonged by a further two months when the young groom was finally knighted at the cathedral of Notre-Dame in Paris. John was solemnly granted the arms of a knight in front of a prestigious audience bringing together the kings of Bohemia and Navarre, and the dukes of Burgundy, Lorraine and the Brabant.

Bonne was a patron of the arts, the composer Guillaume de Machaut being one of her favorites.

She died on 11 September 1349 of the bubonic plague in Maubuisson, France at the age of thirty-four. She was buried in the Abbey of Maubuisson.

Less than six months after Bonne's death, John married Joan I, Countess of Auvergne.

Issue
John and Bonne had the following children together:
 Charles V of France (21 January 133816 September 1380)
 Catherine (13381338) died young
 Louis I, Duke of Anjou (23 July 133920 September 1384)
 John, Duke of Berry (30 November 134015 June 1416)
 Philip II, Duke of Burgundy (17 January 134227 April 1404)
 Joan (24 June 13433 November 1373)
 Marie (12 September 1344October 1404), married Robert, Duke of Bar in 1364
Agnes (13451349), died young
Margaret (13471352), died young
 Isabelle (1 October 134811 September 1372)

Ancestors

References

Sources

1315 births
1349 deaths
14th-century deaths from plague (disease)
14th-century Bohemian people
14th-century French people
14th-century Luxembourgian people
14th-century Bohemian women
14th-century French women
14th-century Luxembourgian women
Bohemian princesses
Countesses of Anjou
Countesses of Maine
Czech people of Luxembourgian descent
Czech philanthropists
Duchesses of Aquitaine
Duchesses of Normandy
French people of Czech descent
French people of Luxembourgian descent
French philanthropists
House of Luxembourg
Luxembourgian philanthropists
House of Valois
Czech patrons of the arts
Daughters of kings